Soule James McLeod (September 12, 1908 – August 3, 1981) was a  Major League Baseball third baseman.

External links

1908 births
1981 deaths
Philadelphia Phillies players
Washington Senators (1901–1960) players
Major League Baseball third basemen
Baseball players from Louisiana
Newark Yankees players
Centreville Orioles players